Spiral Walls Containing Autumns of Light is the second album by hip hop artist Divine Styler, released in 1992 on Giant Records. This album marked a significant change in Divine Styler's musical direction, incorporating a much broader range of styles and influences than 1989's Word Power. The album was a major-label release but, perhaps owing to its experimental nature, failed to meet sales expectations. Although largely regarded as a commercial failure, it has since developed a large cult following. Styler was signed to Giant because of Ice-T’s relationship with Warner Bros. Records.

Album overview

Music
Spiral Walls takes influence from a wide variety of music genres such as hip hop, rock, electronic, funk and even elements of spoken word and noise. AllMusic referred to the album as being like '"The Residents meets Funkadelic".

The majority of the album was produced and arranged by Divine Styler himself, which included him performing and processing all of the vocals, playing the guitar, drums (and drum programming), and keyboards, among other instruments. Due to the artist's dominance over the album's direction, it is generally regarded as a very introspective and personal album.

Lyrics
Since Divine Styler was at the time a recent convert to Sunni Islam, lyrical themes of the album mainly focus around the teachings of Islam and praise of Muhammad, with various spoken word pieces demonstrating this.

Critical and public reaction

Retrospective reviews of the album were generally positive, perhaps surprisingly considering the uncompromising nature of the music that the album presented. In his review of the album for Allmusic, Ned Raggett wrote, 
The album also received praise from a number of non-professional sources. This includes an average 5-star rating from Amazon.com, a similarly high rating on Discogs, and a generally positive reaction from users of Rate Your Music.

However, after the album's initial release, reactions in the hip hop community were mixed. Fans expecting a similar album to Word Power were shocked and may have not expected the experimental nature of the album at the time. In a 2008 retrospective review, hip hop journalist Andrew Nosnitsky wrote,

Significance

In Search of Divine Styler

In the spring of 1996, Ryan Somers, a.k.a. Fritz tha Cat, a teenager from London, Canada, started a magazine titled In Search of Divine Styler in order to bring the emcee back from retirement. Eight issues were published over three years, with the magazine growing from 100 copies of the first issue to 10,000-copy print runs that were distributed all across North America.

Later Divine Styler work
After the release of Spiral Walls, strangely, Divine Styler disappeared from the music scene for almost four years. However, he later returned with original Scheme Team member Cokni O'Dire on House of Pain's last album Truth Crushed to Earth Shall Rise Again, exhibiting a more traditional hip-hop style of lyricism similar to his work on Word Power.

Track listing
 "Am I an Epigram for Life?" (1:44)
 "Touch" (5:24)
 "In a World of U" (5:09)
 "Love, Lies, and Lifetime's Cries" (4:10)
 "Livery" (5:02)
 "Grey Matter" (5:42)
 "Heaven Don't Want Me, and Hell's Afraid I'll Take Over" (9:25)
 "Mystic Sheep Drink Electric Tea" (5:14)
 "Width in My Depth" (4:24)
 "The Next" (6:14)
 "Euphoric Rangers" (5:09)
 "Walk of Exodus" (7:48)
 "Aura" (3:16)

Personnel

Music
Divine Styler - Vocals, mixing, keyboards, guitar, rhythm guitar, percussion, drum programming
Tony Guarderas - Bass guitar
Kendu Jenkins - Drums, keyboards
Jeff Phillips - Guitar, rhythm guitar
Brian Foxworthy - Engineering, mixing
Michal Frenke - Engineering
Wally Traugott - Mastering

Album art
Robin Lynch - Art direction and design
Merlyn Rosenberg - Photography
Mario Markus - Computer-generated images
Benno Hess - Computer-generated images

References

External links
A review of the album, including playable tracks
Various reviews of the album at Rate Your Music
The album at Discogs
A blog on Divine Styler, mentioning Spiral Walls

Divine Styler albums
1992 albums
Giant Records (Warner) albums